The Christmas Album is the fifth Christmas album by American pop singer Johnny Mathis that was released on October 15, 2002, by Columbia Records and included his first recordings of three traditional carols ("Joy To The World", "Away in a Manger", "O Little Town of Bethlehem"), three new songs ("Heavenly Peace", "A Christmas Love Song", "Merry Christmas"), and a handful of 20th-century offerings.

In December of that year, the album reached number 23 on Billboard magazine's Top Holiday Albums chart and number 143 on the Billboard 200.

The album also gave Mathis his first entry on Billboard's list of the top Adult Contemporary songs of the week since 1988's number 27 hit "I'm on the Outside Looking In", when "Frosty the Snowman" reached number 29 during the week it spent on the chart in the issue dated January 4, 2003.

Mathis is pictured on the cover at the age of four years.

Reception
This holiday outing elicited another positive review from William Ruhlmann of AllMusic: "Backed by the Irish Film Orchestra, which can be alternately lush and swinging, Mathis creates yet another winning collection."

Track listing
From the liner notes for the original album:

 "Joy To The World" (Lowell Mason, Isaac Watts) – 2:01
 Bob Krogstad – arranger  
 "Heavenly Peace" (Dean Pitchford, Tom Snow) – 3:30
 Robbie Buchanan – arranger  
 "Away in a Manger" (William J. Kirkpatrick) – 2:30
 Robbie Buchanan – arranger  
 "A Christmas Love Song" (Alan and Marilyn Bergman, Johnny Mandel) – 3:35
 Alan Broadbent – arranger  
 "Frosty the Snowman" (Steve Nelson, Jack Rollins) – 2:31
 Bob Krogstad – arranger  
"Have a Holly Jolly Christmas" (Johnny Marks) – 2:00
 Ray Ellis – arranger  
 "O Little Town of Bethlehem" (Phillip Brooks, Lewis H. Redner) – 2:44
 Jonathan Tunick – arranger  
 "I've Got My Love to Keep Me Warm" (Irving Berlin) – 3:34
 Bob Krogstad – arranger  
 Medley – 5:00  a. "Snowfall" (Claude Thornhill)  b. "Christmas Time Is Here" (Vince Guaraldi, Lee Mendelson) 
 Bob Krogstad – arranger  
 "Merry Christmas" (Fred Spielman, Janice Torre) – 3:12
 Jonathan Tunick – arranger

Personnel
From the liner notes for the original album:

Performers
Johnny Mathis – vocals
Robbie Buchanan – keyboards, bass, drums
Randy Waldman – piano
Vinnie Colaiuta – drums
Dave Carpenter – bass
Dean Parks – acoustic guitar
Michael Landau – electric guitar
The Irish Film Orchestra – orchestra
Ken Krogstad – orchestra conductor

Production
Robbie Buchanan – producer
Jay Landers – executive producer
Scott Erickson – associate producer, recording engineer
Bill Schnee – mixing engineer
Dan Garcia – recording engineer
Andrew Boland – recording engineer
John Bolt – recording engineer
Ryan Petrie – assistant recording engineer
Kiran Lynch – assistant recording engineer
Doug Sax – mastering
Robert Hadley – mastering
Catirona Walsh – orchestra management
Dick Bolks – music preparation
Ross DeRoche – music preparation
Scott Erickson – music preparation
Terry Woodson Music – music preparation
Emily Grishman Music – music preparation
Douglas Walter – music preparation
Christine Wilson – art direction
Russell Laschinger – cover and family pictures
David Vance – back cover photography
Mastered at The Mastering Lab, Hollywood, California

References

Bibliography

 

2002 Christmas albums
Christmas albums by American artists
Pop Christmas albums
Johnny Mathis albums
Columbia Records Christmas albums